NGC 922 is a peculiar galaxy in the southern constellation of Fornax, located at a distance of  from the Milky Way. It is one of the nearest known collisional galaxies. This object was described by the Herschels as "considerably faint, pretty large, round, gradually pretty much brighter middle."

This object was originally described as a dust-obscured grand-design galaxy – a term used to indicate a type of spiral galaxy with prominent and well-defined spiral arms. However, observation of its features suggests it has undergone a high-velocity, off-center collision with a nearby dwarf galaxy, designated S2 by Wong et al. (2006), about 330 million years ago. This has resulted in a distinctive C-shaped ring of H-alpha emission. NGC 922 displays ring-like structures created by propagating density waves, as well as spoke-like features and an off-center star-forming bar, all of which features match models of such a collision.

The main galaxy has a stellar mass estimated 5.47 billion times the mass of the Sun (solar mass), while the dwarf companion has 28.2 million solar masses. New star clusters have been formed in the ring or bar with a mean age of 16 million years, whereas older clusters of 50 million years or more are predominantly found in the nuclear region. The tidal plume pointing toward the companion mainly consists of much older stars, indicating not much new star formation has taken place in that feature.

See also
 Cartwheel Galaxy

References

External links
 

Barred spiral galaxies
Ring galaxies
Peculiar galaxies
Interacting galaxies

0922
Fornax (constellation)
-04-06-037
02228-2500
478-28
UGCA objects
009172